Matt Mason is an American poet based in Omaha, Nebraska, born in 1968. In 2019, he was named Nebraska's 3rd State Poet, serving from 2019 until November 2023. He has published eight chapbooks and two full-length works of poetry as well as two anthologies. Mason has written about fatherhood, relationships, religion and the Bible, and themes of Midwest and Great Plains life. Mason's early work gave him a reputation as a humorous poet, but he has written comedy, drama, and tragedy.

Six of Mason's eight chapbooks have been published through his own small press, Morpo Press. His second book The Baby That Ate Cincinnati was released in 2013 by the Stephen F. Austin University Press.  The anthology Slamma Lamma Ding Dong (2005), which Mason co-edited, was made available through iuniverse and won the 2006 Nebraska Book Award for Best Anthology.

Mason currently serves as Executive Director of Nebraska Writers Collective, festival coordinator for the Louder Than a Bomb: Great Plains Youth Poetry Festival, past board president for the Nebraska Center for the Book, and served as a consultant for the Nebraska Arts Council for Nebraska’s Poetry Out Loud program (an NEA/Poetry Foundation program) until 2016. He has served on the board of directors for the Nebraska Literary Heritage Association, the Omaha Entertainment and Arts Awards, Friends of the Omaha Public Library, and the Medusa Project.  In October, 2015, Mason served as a representative for the U.S. State Department in Romania teaching Poetry slam to high schools students in various cities. Mason has also been in charge of State Department programs in Belarus (2008), Nepal (2010), and Botswana (2014).

Mason is married to the poet Sarah McKinstry-Brown (Sarah Mason). They have two daughters, Sophia and Lucia.

Bibliography

Chapbooks
Old Froggo's Book of Practical Cows, Morpo Press, 1997.
Desire for More Cows, Morpo Press, 1998. 
A Blessing and A Curse, Morpo Press, 2000. 
A Still, Small Voice, Morpo Press, 2001. 
Coffee and Astronomy and Other Poems, Morpo Press, 2001.
Mistranslating Neruda, New Michigan Press, 2002.
Red, White, Blue, Morpo Press, 2003.
When the Bough Breaks, Lone Willow Press, 2005.

Books
Things We Don't Know We Don't Know, Backwaters Press, 2006 
The Baby That Ate Cincinnati, Stephen F. Austin University Press, 2013 
I Have a Poem the Size of the Moon, Stephen F. Austin University Press, 2020

Poems

References

External links 
A Review of Matt Mason's chapbooks
The Megaspectacular Uberpage
Poetry Menu
Poetry Foundation
Healing Arts Center poetry slam.

1968 births
Living people
American male poets
Poets from Nebraska
Writers from Omaha, Nebraska
21st-century American poets
21st-century American male writers